Jankov may refer to places in the Czech Republic:

Jankov (Benešov District), a municipality and village in the Central Bohemian Region
Jankov (České Budějovice District), a municipality and village in the South Bohemian Region
Jankov (Pelhřimov District), a municipality and village in the Vysočina Region